Jo Jo Laine (born Joanne LaPatrie, Danvers, Massachusetts, July 13, 1952 – London, October 29, 2006) was an American singer, model and actress, who married The Moody Blues founder Denny Laine while he was a member of Paul McCartney's group Wings. Originally a groupie who had affairs with Jim Morrison, Jimi Hendrix and many other artists, she had a lengthy relationship with Rod Stewart just before meeting Laine.

Biography

Recording artist
Laine recorded with Sting and Andy Summers of The Police on her Pye Records single "Hulk" (the B-side was "Dancing Man"; the musicians from The Police possibly appeared only on the A-side), and with Ray Fenwick of the group Fancy in Jo Jo Laine & The Firm for Mercury Records. She was friends with the members of Led Zeppelin, and rumor has it when Jimmy Page wanted the name The Firm, there were no objections from Laine. She dated producer Jimmy Miller from 1986 to 1988, and he in turn produced a number of recordings for her, including a remake of Gerry Goffin and Carole King's Herman's Hermits hit "(I'm Into) Something Good", which Laine changed  to "I'm In For Something Good!"

In 1986, Laine managed the British group The Mannish Boys, and also performed in the Boston band Gear.

From 1991 to 1996, Laine and her children lived on the estate of Alexander Thynn, 7th Marquess of Bath.

Memoirs
Laine's memoirs appeared in the British tabloid Sunday People, in a series of articles on April 17, April 18 and May 1, 1983.

Death

Laine died at St George's Hospital, Tooting, London, at the age of 54, after a fall at her former home of Yew Corner, in Laleham, Surrey. She is survived by her children, Laine and Heidi Jo Hines (from her marriage to Denny Laine); and a son Boston O'Donohue, from a relationship with Peter O'Donohue.

References

External links
 
 
 

1952 births
Musicians from Boston
American expatriates in England
2006 deaths
20th-century American singers
20th-century American women singers
21st-century American women